The Sea of the Hebrides is a small, partly sheltered section of the North Atlantic Ocean, indirectly off the southern part of the north-west coast of Scotland. To the east are the mainland of Scotland and the northern Inner Hebrides (including Skye and the Small Isles); to the west are the southern Outer Hebrides islands, principally South Uist, Eriskay, and Barra. To the north is the Little Minch, a channel connecting it with the Minch.

The Sea of the Hebrides forms part of the Inner Seas off the West Coast of Scotland, as defined by the International Hydrographic Organization, and part of the Seas west of Scotland as far as fisheries management is concerned.

Ending on 30 August 2019, the Scottish Government consulted on a proposal to designate the Sea of the Hebrides a Marine Protected Area (MPA). The designation was confirmed in December 2020.

References

External links
Sea of the Hebrides MPA Summary Leaflet - Scottish Government

Scottish coast
Hebrides
Seas of the Atlantic Ocean
European seas
Bodies of water of Scotland
Marine Protected Areas of Scotland